The occult is a category of supernatural beliefs and practices, encompassing such phenomena as those involving mysticism, spirituality, and magic in terms of any otherworldly agency. It can also refer to other non-religious supernatural ideas like extra-sensory perception and parapsychology.

The occult (from the Latin word occultus "clandestine, hidden, secret") is "knowledge of the hidden". In common usage, occult refers to "knowledge of the paranormal", as opposed to "knowledge of the measurable", usually referred to as science. The term is sometimes taken to mean knowledge that "is meant only for certain people" or that "must be kept hidden", but for most practicing occultists it is simply the study of a deeper spiritual reality that extends beyond pure reason and the physical sciences. The terms esoteric and arcane can also be used to describe the occult, in addition to their meanings unrelated to the supernatural. The term occult sciences was used in the 16th century to refer to astrology, alchemy, and natural magic, which today are considered pseudosciences.

The term occultism emerged in 19th-century France, where it came to be associated with various French esoteric groups connected to Éliphas Lévi and Papus, and in 1875 was introduced into the English language by the esotericist Helena Blavatsky. Throughout the 20th century, the term was used idiosyncratically by a range of different authors, but by the 21st century was commonly employed – including by academic scholars of esotericism – to refer to a range of esoteric currents that developed in the mid-19th century and their descendants. Occultism is thus often used to categorise such esoteric traditions as Spiritualism, Theosophy, Anthroposophy, the Hermetic Order of the Golden Dawn, and New Age.

It also describes a number of magical organizations or orders, the teachings and practices taught by them, and to a large body of current and historical literature and spiritual philosophy related to this subject.

A 
Abbey of Thelema
Abramelin oil
Acupuncture
Adept
Aether
Akashic Records
Alchemy
Alphabet of Desire
Amulet
Anthroposophy
Apparitions - See Ghost
Argenteum Astrum
Ariosophy
Ascended master
Astral projection
Astrological age
Astrological aspect
Astrology
Astrology and alchemy
Astrology and the classical elements
Astrology and numerology
Athame
Aura
Augury (interpreting omens)
Automatic writing

B 
Banishing
Baphomet
Bibliomancy
Biosophy
Black magic
Black Sun
Body of light
Boline

C 
Cartomancy (divination using playing cards)
Ceremonial magic
Chalice
Chaos magic
Charmstone
Chinese astrology
Clairaudience (ability to hear voices & sounds super-normally- spirited voices alleging to be those of dead people giving advice or warnings)
Clairsentience (supernormal sense perception)
Clairvoyance (ability to see objects or events spontaneously or supernormally above their normal range of vision- second sight)
Cleromancy
Color therapy
Cone of power
Conjuration (summoning up a spirit by incantation)
Coven (a community of witches)
Crystal gazing

D 
Da'at
Demonology
Divination
Dowsing

E 
Earth mysteries
Ectoplasm (unknown substance from body of a medium)
Eight-circuit model of consciousness
Elemental
Enchanting
Energy (esotericism)
English Qaballa
Enochian
E.S.P. (extra sensory perception)
Esoteric Christianity
Esoteric cosmology
Esotericism
Evocation
Exorcism

F 
Fama Fraternitatis
Familiar spirit
Feng shui
Feri Tradition
Folk religion
Fortune-telling

G 
Galdr
Gematria
Geomancy
Geomantic figures
Gnosis
Gnosis (chaos magic)
Goetia
Gray magic
Great Work (Hermeticism)
Great Work (Thelema)
Greater and lesser magic
Grimoire

H 
Hadit
Haruspex
Hermeticism
Hexagram
Hex
Holy Guardian Angel
Homunculus
Hoodoo
Huna

I 
I Ching
Incantation
Invocation

J 
Juju

K 
Kabbalah
Kia (magic)
Kundalini energy

L 
Law of contagion
Left-hand path and right-hand path
Lesser banishing ritual of the pentagram
Liminality
List of occultists
List of occult symbols
List of occult writers
Literomancy
Lithomancy
Lucifer

M 
Magic (paranormal)
Magic circle
Magic word
Magical formula
Magick
Maleficium (sorcery)
Mathers table
Mediumship
Merkabah mysticism
Mesmerism
Methods of divination
Mojo
Mystery religion
Mysticism

N 
Nagual
Necromancy
Necronomicon
Neodruidism
Neopaganism
Neotantra
New Age
New Thought
Nuit
Numerology

O 
Obeah and Wanga
Occultism
Oneiromancy
Ouija

P 
Paganism
Palmistry
Pentacle
Penuel
Planetary hours
Poppet
Power Animal
Pow-wow (folk magic)
Psionics
Psychic
Psychonautics
Pyramid power

Q 
Qabalah
Quantum mysticism
Quareia

R 
Reiki
Renaissance magic
Rhabdomancy
Rosicrucianism
Runecasting

S 
Satan
Satanism
Scrying
Séance
Secret Chiefs
Seidr
Seven Rays
Servitor (chaos magic)
Sex magic
Sigil
Sigil of Baphomet
Sigillum Dei
Sorcery
Spell
Stregheria
Subtle body
Synchromysticism

T 
Table of correspondences
Talisman
Tarot divination
Thaumaturgy
Thelema
Theosophy
Therianthropy
Theurgy
Trance
True Will

U 
Ukehi

V 
Vampires
Voodoo death
Voodoo doll
Vril

W 
Wand 
White magic
Wicca
Witchcraft

Y 
Ya sang

Z 
Zos Kia Cultus

References 

Folklore